Acraea loranae is a butterfly in the family Nymphalidae. It is found in the Democratic Republic of the Congo (Shaba).

Taxonomy
It is a member of the Acraea  acrita species group.

References

Butterflies described in 1987
loranae
Endemic fauna of the Democratic Republic of the Congo
Butterflies of Africa